The Coppa Placci is a semi-classic European bicycle race held between Imola, Italy and San Marino. Since 2005, the race has been organised as a 1.HC event on the UCI Europe Tour.

The race is named after Antonio Placci, a cyclist born in Imola who died in 1921, two years before the race was created.

Because of sponsorship problems, in 2010 the race has been excluded from the UCI Europe Tour and was reserved to the Elite/Under 23 Category.

In 2011 the race was held as Giro della Romagna – Coppa Placci and won by Oscar Gatto.

In 2012 the race also merged with another Italian classic, the Giro del Veneto; the Giro del Veneto – Coppa Placci was won again by Oscar Gatto.

The race should have returned in 2013 as Coppa Placci. The edition was scheduled on 16 October 2013 as a 1.1 event; however, the race was later cancelled again.

Winners

{{Cycling past winner rider|year=2011*|nat=ITA|name=|team=}}
{{Cycling past winner rider|year=2012**|nat=ITA|name=|team=}}

*as Giro della Romagna – Coppa Placci

**as Giro del Veneto – Coppa Placci

References

External links
 

UCI Europe Tour races
Cycle races in Italy
Classic cycle races
Recurring sporting events established in 1923
1923 establishments in Italy
Cycle racing in San Marino